George Victor Bishop (11 June 1932 – 8 June 2005), known professionally as Ed Bishop or sometimes Edward Bishop, was an American actor. He was known for playing Commander Ed Straker in UFO, Captain Blue in Captain Scarlet and the Mysterons and for voicing Philip Marlowe in a series of BBC Radio adaptations of the Marlowe novels by Raymond Chandler.

Early life
George Victor Bishop was born on 11 June 1932, the son of a Manhattan banker, in Brooklyn, New York. He attended Peekskill High School before a brief spell at teacher training college. Bishop served in the United States Army as a disc jockey with the Armed Forces Radio at St. John's in Newfoundland where he was introduced to acting with the St John's Players.

After leaving the army, Bishop enrolled at Boston University where he initially studied business administration but halfway through the course, transferred to drama, much against his parents' wishes. After graduating in Theatre Arts, he won a Fulbright Scholarship to study for two years at the London Academy of Music and Dramatic Art, from which he graduated in 1959; he almost immediately found work in the British theatre and film industries. He adopted the stage name "Ed Bishop" at this time to distinguish himself from George Bishop, an established actor of the time. His first Broadway appearance was as Villebosse in David Merrick's production of Jean Anouilh's The Rehearsal in 1963, though he returned to Britain in 1964.

Career
Bishop made his film acting debut as an ambulance driver in Stanley Kubrick's 1962 movie Lolita. He played an American astronaut going to the Moon in the film The Mouse on the Moon (1963) and also appeared in The Bedford Incident (1965) and Battle Beneath the Earth (1967). He had small speaking roles in the James Bond films You Only Live Twice (1967) and Diamonds Are Forever (1971), but was not included in the film credits for either. He appeared in a second Kubrick film, 2001: A Space Odyssey (1968), in which he played the Captain of the Aries 1B Moon shuttle. The role initially featured dialogue but this was later cut from his scenes.

Bishop appeared in various film and television projects created by producer Gerry Anderson. He provided narration, in addition to the voice of Captain Blue, for Anderson's Supermarionation puppet series, Captain Scarlet and the Mysterons (1967), and appeared in Anderson's science-fiction film Doppelgänger (1969). Perhaps his most prominent screen role was that of Commander Ed Straker in Anderson's science-fiction series UFO (1970–71). Bishop's dark hair was initially dyed blond for the role, though he eventually wore a blond wig instead.

In later years, he appeared in films such as Twilight's Last Gleaming, Saturn 3, Silver Dream Racer, and The Lords of Discipline. He provided vocal work for the 1974 animated TV series of Star Trek, and appeared as Lieutenant Colonel Harrity in the final episode of the British World War II prisoner-of-war drama Colditz. In the 1980s, he made several appearances on The Kenny Everett Television Show, Whoops Apocalypse (he also appeared in the subsequent film), and had a role in the children's television series Chocky's Children.

On radio in 1977 and 1978, Bishop played the private eye Philip Marlowe in The BBC Presents: Philip Marlowe, adaptations of Raymond Chandler's stories for the BBC. The last of these, Farewell, My Lovely, was produced almost a decade after the others, as the rights had previously been unavailable.

He continued to act on film, TV and radio, usually in British and European productions, and was a frequent guest at science fiction conventions. He and fellow Anderson actor Shane Rimmer (a Canadian actor who often worked in the UK) joked about how frequently their professional paths crossed and termed themselves "Rent-a-yank". They appeared together as NASA operatives in the opening of You Only Live Twice and as United States Navy sailors in The Bedford Incident, as well as the 1983 film of the Harold Robbins novel The Lonely Lady. In 1989, Bishop was reunited with Rimmer and another Anderson actor, Matt Zimmerman, in the BBC Radio 4 adaptation of Sir Arthur Conan Doyle's A Study in Scarlet. He and Rimmer also toured together in theatre shows, including Death of a Salesman in the 1990s, and they both appeared in the BBC drama-documentary Hiroshima (2005), one of Bishop's last TV projects.

In 2000, Bishop briefly reprised the role of Captain Blue in a trailer for the new Captain Scarlet series. He did not, however, reprise the role for the actual series, which would not debut until five years later. In 2002, he recorded a commentary for the DVD release of UFO. In 2003, he performed in the Doctor Who audio drama, Full Fathom Five, produced by Big Finish Productions.

Personal life
Bishop was politically active, participating in the March 2003 UK protest against the Iraq War. Bishop had already shown his disapproval of the military-industrial complex when, in 1993, he gatecrashed an arms-trade fair held in Aldershot, Hampshire whilst dressed to resemble Augusto Pinochet. During the Aldershot protest he met photographer Jane Skinner, who later became his third wife.
 
Bishop was married three times; first to Jane Thwaites in 1955 before divorcing a few months later in the year. He then married Hilary Preen in 1962; they had four children, they remained married for thirty-four years before divorcing in 1996. He later married photographer Jane Skinner in 2001, the marriage lasted until his death in 2005.

Death

Bishop died on 8 June 2005 at the age of 72, three days before his 73rd birthday, and five days after the death of his UFO co-star Michael Billington. He succumbed to a chest infection contracted while undergoing treatment for leukemia. He is buried in the churchyard of the Parish Church of Saint Lawrence in Napton, Warwickshire, having previously lived there for many years. His grey sandstone tombstone has a peace symbol prominently engraved on it. Its design is very similar to the one situated two metres (6 feet) on the right, which marks the grave of his son Daniel (16 May 1967 – 18 January 1988), who was killed in a car accident in Cumbria. Bishop's epitaph (from Red River Valley) reads: From This Valley They Say You Are Going. We Shall Miss Your Bright Eyes And Your Smile. He spent the last few years of his life living in West Molesey.

His life and work were honoured at the British Academy Television Awards in May 2006. He was survived by his widow, by three daughters from his second marriage (Georgina, Jessica and Serina) .

Filmography

Film

Television

Discography
 Jerome Kern: Show Boat, conducted by John McGlinn, EMI, 1988

References

External links

Obituary in The Independent

1932 births
2005 deaths
Alumni of the London Academy of Music and Dramatic Art
American anti-war activists
American expatriate male actors in the United Kingdom
American male film actors
American male radio actors
American male stage actors
American male television actors
American male voice actors
Boston University College of Fine Arts alumni
Male actors from New York City
United States Army soldiers
People from Brooklyn
Activists from New York (state)
20th-century American male actors
American emigrants to England
Fulbright alumni